Yabluniv is an urban-type settlement in Kosiv Raion, Ivano-Frankivsk Oblast, Ukraine. It is located on the banks of the river Luchka,  from Kolomyia. Yabluniv hosts the administration of Yabluniv settlement hromada, one of the hromadas of Ukraine. Population: .

History
The town had an historically important Jewish population but they were murdered during the Holocaust in Ukraine.

Famous people 
 Stanisław Jan Jabłonowski (1634–1702) was a Polish nobleman, magnate, outstanding military commander.
 Maksymilian Nowicki (1826–90) was a Polish zoology professor and pioneer conservationist in Galicia and father of the poet Franciszek Nowicki.
 Mykola Matiyiv-Melnyk (1890–1947) was a Ukrainian writer and journalist.
 Anne Werzberg, mother of French mime Marcel Marceau (born Marcel Mangel)

Museums 
Museum "Wooden Sculpture"

Places of interest 
Yablonov Jewish Cemetery

References

External links 
 Yablonov Jewish Cemetery fully documented at Jewish Galicia and Bukovina ORG

Urban-type settlements in Kosiv Raion
Holocaust locations in Ukraine